Anthony Michael Pilla (November 12, 1932 – September 21, 2021) was an American prelate of the Roman Catholic Church. He served as an auxiliary bishop of the Diocese of Cleveland in Ohio from 1979 to 1981 and as bishop of the same diocese from 1981 to 2006.

Biography

Early life 
Anthony Pilla was born on November 12, 1932, in Cleveland, Ohio. He attended Cathedral Latin High School in Cleveland for several years before the family moved to Cincinnati.  Pilla graduated in 1951 from St. Gregory Seminary College in Cincinnati, then went to study at Borromeo College in Wickliffe, Ohio, until 1955.  Pilla completed his preparation for the priesthood at Saint Mary Seminary in Cleveland. 

Pilla was ordained a priest by Bishop Floyd Begin for the Diocese of Cleveland on May 23, 1959.

Auxiliary Bishop of Cleveland 
On June 30, 1979, Pope John Paul II named Pilla as titular bishop of Scardona and auxiliary bishop of the Diocese of Cleveland. He was consecrated by Bishop James Hickey on August 1, 1979. The principal co-consecrators were Bishops Clarence Issenmann and Joseph Francis. 

Pilla was named apostolic administrator of the diocese on July 29, 1980, after Hickey was named archbishop of the Archdiocese of Washington.

Bishop of Cleveland 
Pilla was named bishop of the Diocese of Cleveland on November 13, 1980 by Pope John Paul II. Pilla was installed on January 6, 1981. He  was elected president of the National Conference of Catholic Bishops in November, 1995, serving until 1998.

In March 2002, Pilla published a list of 28 priests accused of sexual abuse of minors.  Fifteen of them were 15 active priests, who Pilla suspended from ministry.  Earlier that year Cuyahoga County Prosecutor William Mason announced an investigation to sexual abuse of minors by diocesan priests. 

In 2005, 36 lay members of the diocese sued Pilla, accusing him of allowing $2 million in diocesan funds to be stolen.  The judge dismissed the lawsuit, saying that the plaintiffs did not have the legal standing to sue in this case.

Retirement and legacy 
On April 4, 2006, Pope Benedict XVI accepted Pilla's resignation as bishop of the Diocese of Cleveland.  He was replaced by Auxiliary Bishop Richard Lennon on the same day.  

In May 2008, Pilla testified for the prosecution in the embezzlement trial of Joseph Smith, the assistant treasurer for the Diocese of Cleveland.  Smith had been accused of stealing $784,000 from the diocese through a kickback scheme with an accomplice. Smith's lawyers claimed that Pilla and other diocesan clergy were guilty of that theft. Pilla said that in 2004 he had received an anonymous letter accusing Smith of theft.  After meeting with Pilla, Smith went on administrative lead and later resigned. In his testimony, Pilla praised Smith and said that he left the financial management of the diocese up to him.  Smith was acquitted of embezzlement, but convicted of tax evasion; he received one year in prison.

In July 2011, an Ohio man sued Pilla and the Diocese of Cleveland, saying that their negligence allowed a priest to sexually abuse him when he was a boy. The plaintiff claimed that Patrick O’Connor, a diocesan priest at St. Jude Parish in Elyria, Ohio, abused him from 1997 to 1999 when he was a boy.  Pilla knew that O'Connor had previously abused a child at  St. Joseph Parish in Cuyahoga Falls, Ohio.  The diocese had settled with that victim and sent O'Connor to Elyria.  O'Connor pleaded guilty to corruption of a minor in 2009.  

Anthony Pilla died in Cleveland on September 21, 2021 at age 88.

See also

 Catholic Church hierarchy
 Catholic Church in the United States
 Historical list of the Catholic bishops of the United States
 List of Catholic bishops of the United States
 Lists of patriarchs, archbishops, and bishops

References

External links

 Roman Catholic Diocese of Cleveland Official Site

 

Roman Catholic Ecclesiastical Province of Cincinnati
American religious leaders
Roman Catholic bishops of Cleveland
20th-century Roman Catholic bishops in the United States
21st-century Roman Catholic bishops in the United States
John Carroll University alumni
1932 births
2021 deaths